Explorers' Monument may refer to:

 Westland Explorers' Monument (aka Explorers' Monument), an 1868 obelisk in Hokitika, New Zealand
 Explorers' Monument (Western Australia), a 1913 monument in Freemantle, Australia
 Explorers Monument (Grand Canyon), a summit in the Grand Canyon in Arizona, United States